The courante, corrente, coranto and corant are some of the names given to a family of triple metre dances from the late Renaissance and the Baroque era. In a Baroque dance suite an Italian or French courante is typically paired with a preceding allemande, making it the second movement of the suite or the third if there is a prelude.

Types

Courante literally means "running", and in the later Renaissance the courante was danced with fast running and jumping steps, as described by Thoinot Arbeau. But the courante commonly used in the baroque period was described by Johann Mattheson in Der vollkommene Capellmeister (Hamburg, 1739) as "chiefly characterized by the passion or mood of sweet expectation. For there is something heartfelt, something longing and also gratifying, in this melody: clearly music on which hopes are built." Johann Gottfried Walther in the Musicalisches Lexicon (Leipzig, 1732), wrote that the rhythm of the courante is "absolutely the most serious one can find."

During the Baroque era there were two types of courante; the French and the Italian.

Sometimes French and Italian spellings are used to distinguish types of courante, but original spellings were inconsistent. Bach uses courante and corrente to differentiate the French and Italian styles respectively in his Partitas of the Clavierübung and, in Dance and the Music of J. S. Bach by Meredith Little and Natalie Jenne, the courante and corrente are treated as distinct dances, but editors have frequently ignored the distinction.

In Bach's unaccompanied Partita for Violin No. 2 the first movement (titled Allemanda) begins as if in  time in a manner one might initially perform and hear as a courante. The second movement is titled corrente and is rather lively. An indication of faster tempo that appears to exist in Baroque composer Georg Muffat's instructions on Lullian bowing is a confusion in translation.

See also
 Baroque dance
 Renaissance dance

References

Further reading
Lenneberg, Hans. 1958. "Johann Mattheson on Affect and Rhetoric in Music: A Translation of Selected Portions of Der vollkommene Capellmeister (1739)". Journal of Music Theory 2, no. 1 (April) and no. 2 (November): 47–84, 193–236.
Mattheson, Johann. 1739. Der vollkommene Capellmeister: Das ist, Gründliche Anzeige aller derjenigen Sachen, die einer wissen, können, und vollkommen inne haben muß, der einer Capelle mit Ehren und Nutzen vorstehen will. Hamburg: verlegts Christian Herold. Facsimile reprint, fifth edition, edited by Margarete Reimann. Documenta Musicologica 1. Reihe, Druckschriften-Faksimiles 5. Kassel: Bärenreiter-Verlag, 1991. .
Mattheson, Johann. 1981. Johann Mattheson's Der vollkommene Capellmeister", a revised translation with critical commentary by Ernest Charles Harriss. Studies in musicology 21. Ann Arbor: UMI Research Press. .
Walther, Johann Gottfried. 1732. Musicalisches Lexicon oder, Musicalische Bibliothec''. Leipzig: verlegts Wolffgang Deer. Facsimile reprint, edited by Richard Schaal. Documenta musicologica, 1. Reihe, Druckschriften-Faksimiles, 3. Kassel: Bärenreiter-Verlag, 1953. Modern edition of the text and musical illustrations, edited by Friederike Ramm. Kassel: Bärenreiter-Verlag & Karl Vötterle GmbH & Co. KG, 2001. .

External links
 Video – La Courante Reglée – basic steps demonstrated and described, in costume, by Dancilla
 Video – Renaissance courante reconstructed by period group
 Video – basic steps in theatre class
 Video – Musical Contexts – Courante in Action – reonstruction for Baroque Orchestral Music (AQA GCSE Music)

Renaissance dance
Baroque music
Baroque dance
Triple time dances
Dance forms in classical music
Renaissance music